Fumin may refer to:

Fumin County (富民县), Kunming, Yunnan, China
Fumin Subdistrict, Meihekou (福民街道), Jilin, China
Fumin Subdistrict, Fushun (福民街道), in Xinfu District, Fushun, Liaoning, China
Fumin, Huinan County (抚民镇), Jilin, China

Other:
Fumin (grape), Italian grape variety from Valle d'Aosta